Jean-Paul Huchon (born 29 July 1946) is a French retired civil servant and politician who served as Mayor of Conflans-Sainte-Honorine from 1994 to 2001 and President of the Regional Council of Île-de-France from 1998 until 2015.

Biography 
Jean-Paul Huchon graduated from Sciences Po in 1967 and from the École nationale d'administration in 1971.

 1971 to 1975: civil administrator at the Budget Directorate of the Finance Ministry
 1975 to 1978: civil administrator at the International Relations Directorate of the Labour and Social Affairs Ministry
 1978 to 1981: head of the Agriculture and European Office at the Budget Directorate of the Finance Ministry
 1981 to 1985: Chief of Staff to Michel Rocard (Planning Commission, then Agriculture Ministry)
 1985 to 1986: general manager of Crédit Agricole
 1988 to 1991: Chief of Staff to Michel Rocard (Prime Minister of France)
 1991 to 1998: general manager for François Pinault
 2006 to 2015: president of the Metropolis organisation

In 2007, Huchon was found guilty of illegal taking of interest together with his wife Dominique Le Texier in a case of public contracts awarded in 2002 and 2003. On appeal in 2008 he was found guilty again and sentenced to a suspended prison sentence of 6 months and a €60,000 fine. He did not run for reelection in 2015 and later became an adjunct professor at HEC Paris. In 2018, he was named honorary president of the regional council.

Huchon was a keynote speaker at the 2008 Metropolis congress in Sydney, October 2008. Huchon addressed world mayors and industry leaders on issues of eco-regions and governance in the 21st century.

Political career

Electoral mandates

Regional council 

 President of the Regional Council of Île-de-France: 1998–2015, reelected in 2004, 2010.
 Regional councillor of Île-de-France: 1998–2015, reelected in 2004, 2010.

Municipal council 

 Mayor of Conflans-Sainte-Honorine: 1994–2001. Elected in 1994, after the resignation of Michel Rocard. Reelected in 1995.
 Deputy Mayor of Conflans-Sainte-Honorine: 1977–1994. Reelected in 1983, 1989.
 Municipal councillor of Conflans-Sainte-Honorine: 1977–2014. Reelected in 1983, 1989, 1995, 2001, 2008.

Awards 
 Légion d'honneur officer
 Ordre national du Mérite
 Mérite Agricole

Books
1972: Le Marché Commun
1993: Jours tranquilles à Matignon
2002: La Montagne aux singes
2005: Ceux qui aiment ne peuvent pas perdre

References

External links 
 Jean-Paul Huchon on buenosaires2015.metropolis.org/speakers

|-

1946 births
Living people
Presidents of the Regional Council of Île-de-France
Members of the Regional Council of Île-de-France
Socialist Party (France) politicians
Sciences Po alumni
École nationale d'administration alumni
Politicians from Paris
Officiers of the Légion d'honneur
Recipients of the Order of Agricultural Merit
French politicians convicted of crimes
Academic staff of HEC Paris